Do It is an Australian weekly half-hour lifestyle television program broadcast on the Nine Network.

The program is hosted by Luke van Dyck, a third generation builder who has previously appeared on other lifestyle programs such Renovation Rescue and DIY Rescue.

The program covers a whole range of home improvement projects where each step is outlined so that viewers can carry out the task themselves around their own home. The program is supported by their website where detailed guides for each project are available.

See also 
 List of Australian television series

References

External links 
 
 

Australian non-fiction television series
Nine Network original programming
2006 Australian television series debuts
2008 Australian television series endings